Wootton Rivers Halt railway station is a former railway station in Wootton Rivers, Wiltshire, England, on the Reading to Taunton line. The station opened in 1928 at the south end of the village, near the south bank of the Kennet and Avon Canal, and closed in 1966.

References

 

Disused railway stations in Wiltshire
Former Great Western Railway stations
Railway stations in Great Britain opened in 1928
Railway stations in Great Britain closed in 1966
Beeching closures in England